Anderson Park may refer to:

Australia
 Anderson Park, Neutral Bay, New South Wales
 Anderson Park, Townsville, Queensland

New Zealand
 Anderson Park, Invercargill

United States
 Anderson Park (New Jersey) in Montclair, New Jersey 
 Anderson River Park in Anderson, California
 Anderson Park (Redmond, Washington)
 Cal Anderson Park

See also
 Anderson .Paak (born 1986), an American rapper, singer, songwriter, record producer and multi-instrumentalist from California